Lahojärv, or Lake Laho, is a lake in Säässaare village, Põlva Parish, Põlva County, in southern Estonia.

See also
List of lakes of Estonia

Lakes of Estonia
Põlva Parish
Lakes of Põlva County